is a Japanese television writer, screenwriter, lyricist, radio personality, and tarento.

Current appearances

Tokyo Broadcasting System

Fuji Television

TV Asahi

Screenplays
TV drama

TV anime

Films

Anime films

Stage

Others

Discography

SMAP

Others

Advertisements

Music videos

Live

Bibliography

Others

See also
Mitsuyoshi Takasu

References

External links
 
Mikage yu 
TV o Omoshiroku suru "Hōsō Sakka" Osamu Suzuki × Hirotaka Aikawa imaji n Daihyō Torishimariyaku Shachō 
Osamu Suzuki, Nissan o Butai ni Social Media ni Honki de Chōsen 

Japanese screenwriters
Japanese lyricists
Japanese television writers
Japanese radio personalities
Writers from Chiba Prefecture
Japanese television personalities
1972 births
Living people